Dean Leonard Buchanan (born 22 June 1952) is a New Zealand-based abstract and landscape painter.
 He has exhibited widely throughout New Zealand, as well as in Chile, the USA, and Japan. His first solo show in 1978 was at the Outreach Gallery in Ponsonby, Auckland. He has also been involved in many group shows - the first at the age of 19, the “ Young Contemporaries” at The Auckland City Art Gallery in 1971.

 Dean Buchanan is one of New Zealand’s best-known artists. From an early age he showed talent, painting large oils that demonstrated both technical brilliance and a close affinity with the natural world. During the past thirty years he has become probably New Zealand’s most prolific (and also most affordable) painter, as well as one of the most instantly recognisable.

His paintings are found in homes throughout New Zealand, in public buildings and galleries both here and overseas. He has also exhibited in Australia, Japan, Chile, Switzerland and the USA.
Coupled with his creative talent is an ability to live life to the full. No shrinking violet, 'Wild Beast’ Buchanan has always expressed himself forthrightly, especially in defence of preserving New Zealand’s natural environment. He has also become a mountaineer of some note, and in January 2007 succeeded in climbing Aoraki / Mount Cook. Bob Harvey interviewed Dean Buchanan extensively for this book, and describes every facet of his life. The book also includes sixty reproductions of some of his greatest paintings.

 Over a period of about forty years artist Dean Buchanan has continually put his distinct and dynamic view of New Zealand landscape on canvas and hessian. The physical kind of relationship Buchanan has with the landscape is translated directly into his quick and forthright way of painting. The impact the landscape has on him is also clear in his work, which is bold in color and line and full of a sense of rhythm.

Solo exhibitions
1978 Outreach Gallery Auckland New Zealand
1979 Little Maidment Theatre Auckland New Zealand
1980 100m2 Auckland New Zealand
1981 Denis Cohn Gallery Auckland New Zealand
1982 Outreach Gallery Auckland New Zealand
1982 Little Maidment Theatre Auckland New Zealand
1983 Outreach Gallery Auckland New Zealand
1984 New Vision Gallery Auckland New Zealand
1985 ANZAS Auckland New Zealand
1986 Words and Pictures Auckland New Zealand
1986 Auckland Society of Arts Auckland New Zealand
1987 Waitemata City Arts and Cultural Centre, Auckland, New Zealand
1987 Auckland Society of Arts Auckland New Zealand
1988 N.Z High Commission Los Angeles USA
1988 Amy Thomas Gallery Boca Raton USA
1989 Charlotte H Gallery Auckland New Zealand
1990 Gallery 119 Hamilton New Zealand
1990 Daikokuya Ginza Tokyo Japan
1991 Whangarei Art Gallery Whangarei New Zealand
1992 Milford House Dunedin New Zealand
1992 Tanishima Gallery Tokyo Japan
1993 Warwick Henderson Gallery Auckland New Zealand
1994 Milford House Dunedin New Zealand
1995 Warwick Henderson Gallery Auckland New Zealand
1996 The Pumphouse Gallery Auckland New Zealand
1996 Milford House Dunedin New Zealand
1996 Warwick Henderson Gallery Auckland New Zealand
1997 Lopdell House Gallery, Auckland, New Zealand
1997 Miro Gallery Napier New Zealand
1998 Warwick Henderson Gallery Auckland New Zealand
1999 Milford House Dunedin New Zealand
2000 Warwick Henderson Gallery Auckland New Zealand
2001 Warwick Henderson Gallery Auckland New Zealand
2001 Paciflcart Gallery Zug Switzerland
2004 Warwick Henderson Gallery Auckland New Zealand
2004 Galerle Romerapotheke Zurich Switzerland
2004 West Coast Gallery New Zealand
2005 Corbans Art Centre Auckland New Zealand
2007 Compendium Gallery Auckland New Zealand

References

1953 births
Living people
Place of birth missing (living people)
New Zealand painters